In Greek mythology, Neaera (Ancient Greek: , Néaira), also Neaira, is the name of a minor goddess, a lover of Helios the god of the sun and the mother by him of twins Phaethusa and Lampetia.

Mythology 
In the Odyssey, Circe informs Odysseus that after Neaera bore and nursed her daughters, she sent them to the island of Thrinacia, the island where Helios kept his sacred cows, to tend to the flocks of their father. Homer calls her "divine" without giving her any parentage; Hesychius of Alexandria wrote that 'Neaera' is the name of an Oceanid nymph, though it is not clear whether this Neaera is the same person.

Neaera's name, roughly meaning "younger", relates to Helios, as do the names of their daughters, since the sun is new and young each morning, adding to the symbolism of the Oxen of the Sun episode.

See also 
 Rhodos
 Perse
 Clymene

Notes

References 
 Hesychius of Alexandria, Alphabetical Collection of All Words: Vol. I (alpha through delta).
 Homer; The Odyssey with an English Translation by A.T. Murray, PH.D. in two volumes. Cambridge, MA., Harvard University Press; London, William Heinemann, Ltd. 1919. Online version at the Perseus Digital Library.
 John Tzetzes, Chiliades, books II-IV translated by Gary Berkowitz.
 Smith, William; Dictionary of Greek and Roman Biography and Mythology, London (1873).

External links 
 NEAERA from The Theoi Project

Greek goddesses
Characters in the Odyssey
Women of Helios
Oceanids
Sea and river goddesses